Bloodfist VII: Manhunt is a 1995 American action film directed by Jonathan Winfrey and starring Don Wilson, Jillian McWhirter, Jonathan Penner, and Steven Williams. It was written by Brendan Broderick and Rob Kerchner.

External links

1995 films
1990s English-language films
1990s action films
American action films
American martial arts films
Kickboxing films
Direct-to-video sequel films
American sequel films
1995 martial arts films
Bloodfist films
Films directed by Jonathan Winfrey
1990s American films